Denis Yuryevich Pchelintsev (born 1 December 1979) is a Russian professional football coach and a former player. He is the goalkeepers' coach with FC Krasnodar-2.

Club career
He played 11 seasons in the Russian Football National League for 8 different teams.

References

External links
 

1979 births
People from Novonikolayevsky District
Living people
Russian footballers
Association football goalkeepers
FC KAMAZ Naberezhnye Chelny players
FC Krasnodar players
FC Baltika Kaliningrad players
FC Rotor Volgograd players
FC Shinnik Yaroslavl players
FC Sokol Saratov players
FC Novokuznetsk players
FC Nosta Novotroitsk players
Sportspeople from Volgograd Oblast